

List of Ambassadors

Isi Yanouka 2013-2016 
Yaacov Deckel 1969 - 1973
Yaeir Algom 1964 - 1969
Hagai Dikan (Non-Resident, Abidjan) 1963 - 1964
Shlomo Hillel (Non-Resident, Abidjan) 1961 - 1963

References

Burkina Faso
Israel